Qadi Kola (also Romanized as Qādī Kolā; also known as Pā’īn Qādī Kolā) is a village in Karipey Rural District, Lalehabad District, Babol County, Mazandaran Province, Iran. At the 2006 census, its population was 530, in 144 families.

References 

Populated places in Babol County